T. cornutus may refer to:
 Trachinus cornutus, a weever species in the genus Trachinus
 Triaenobunus cornutus, a harvestman species in the genus Triaenobunus
 Turbo cornutus, a mollusc species

See also
 Cornutus (disambiguation)